The Berling Type Foundry was a Danish type foundry established before 1750 in Copenhagen.  Johann Gottfried Pöetzsch was manager of the Berling typefoundry from 1753 until his death in 1783.  The foundry was reëstablished in Lund, Sweden in 1837 and cast foundry type until 1980.

Typefaces
These foundry types were produced by the Berling Foundry:

References

Letterpress font foundries
Foundries in Denmark
Manufacturing companies based in Copenhagen
Companies based in Lund